The following is a list of films produced in the Kannada film industry in India in 1979, presented in alphabetical order.

See also
Kannada films of 1978
Kannada films of 1995

References

External links
Bharatmovies.com
Kannadastore.com

1979
Kannada
Films, Kannada